Mortgage Choice Limited, commonly known as Mortgage Choice, is an Australian mortgage broking firm.

Mortgage Choice is a current member of the Franchise Council of Australia as well as the Mortgage & Finance Association of Australia; and holds a credit licence (number 382869) issued by ASIC.

Mortgage Choice was listed on the Australian Securities Exchange until it was acquired by REA Group in 2021.

History
The company was founded in 1992 in Sydney by Rod Higgins and Peter Higgins. After two years in operation, the company became a franchisor in 1994 by selling its first franchise license in Wollongong. That grew to a national footprint in 1996.

In 1998 Mortgage Choice launched a website and ran its first TV advertisement one year later.

In 2004, the company officially listed on the Australian Stock Exchange.

In 2008, it launched a diversified product offering, commencing with mortgage protection insurance; in 2011 that offering runs across commercial and personal loans, asset finance and risk and general insurances.

In 2009, Mortgage Choice acquired mortgage aggregator LoanKit
. This re-launched in 2010 as the company's aggregation arm.

In 2010, Mortgage Choice acquired Australian home loan and insurance comparison website HelpMeChoose.com.au; and launched its first white label product bluegum™ home loans.

In 2012, Mortgage Choice launched Mortgage Choice Financial Planning.

In 2016, Mortgage Choice expanded its product offering by launching a branded asset finance offering.

In 2018, Mortgage Choice announced the introduction of a new franchisee remuneration model that would give franchisees a bigger share of trail commissions, via a system in which franchisees can receive commissions based on either their new lending, or existing loans.

In 2021, Mortgage Choice was acquired by REA Group, amalgamating the lesser-known REA Group-owned Smartline broker franchise into the Mortgage Choice brand. The acquisition increased Mortgage Choice's presence to 940+ brokers & 720+ franchises across Australia, as well as increasing the total lending partners to 40+.

Operations
In Australia, Mortgage Choice is a national financial services company with a customer base in excess of 350,000 and a residential home loan panel of over 40 lenders.

The head office is in Sydney, with state offices in Brisbane, Melbourne, Adelaide and Perth.

References

External links
Mortgage Choice website

Companies formerly listed on the Australian Securities Exchange
Financial services companies established in 1992
Financial services companies of Australia
Mortgage industry of Australia
Financial advisors